Copper monosulfide  is a chemical compound of copper and sulfur. It was initially thought to occur in nature as the  dark indigo blue mineral covellite. However, it was later shown to be rather a cuprous compound, formula Cu+3S(S2). CuS is a moderate conductor of electricity. A black colloidal precipitate of CuS is formed when hydrogen sulfide, H2S, is bubbled through solutions of Cu(II) salts. It is one of a number of binary compounds of copper and sulfur (see copper sulfide for an overview of this subject), and has attracted interest because of its potential uses in catalysis and photovoltaics.

Manufacturing
Copper monosulfide can be prepared by passing hydrogen sulfide gas into a solution of copper(II) salt.

Alternatively, it can be prepared by melting an excess of sulfur with copper(I) sulfide or by precipitation with hydrogen sulfide from a solution of anhydrous copper(II) chloride in anhydrous ethanol.

The reaction of copper with molten sulfur followed by boiling sodium hydroxide and the reaction of sodium sulfide with aqueous copper sulfate will also produce copper sulfide.

CuS structure and bonding
Copper sulfide crystallizes in the hexagonal crystal system, and this is the form of the mineral covellite. There is also an amorphous high pressure form which on the basis of the Raman spectrum has been described as having a distorted covellite structure. An amorphous room temperature semiconducting form produced by the reaction of a Cu(II) ethylenediamine complex with thiourea has been reported, which transforms to the crystalline covellite form at 30 °C.
The crystal structure of covellite has been reported several times, and whilst these studies are in general agreement on assigning the space group P63/mmc there are small discrepancies in bond lengths and angles between them. The structure was described as "extraordinary" by Wells and is quite different from copper(II) oxide, but similar to CuSe (klockmannite). The covellite unit cell contains 6 formula units (12 atoms) in which:
 4 Cu atoms have tetrahedral coordination (see illustration).
 2 Cu atoms have trigonal planar coordination (see illustration).
 2 pairs of S atoms are only 207.1 pm apart indicating the existence of an S-S bond (a disulfide unit).
 the  2 remaining S atoms form trigonal planar triangles around the copper atoms, and are surrounded by five Cu atoms in a pentagonal bipyramid (see illustration).
 The S atoms at each end of a disulfide unit are tetrahedrally coordinated to 3 tetrahedrally coordinated Cu atoms and the other S atom in the disulfide unit (see illustration).
The formulation of copper sulfide as CuIIS (i.e. containing no sulfur-sulfur bond) is clearly incompatible with the crystal structure, and also at variance with the observed diamagnetism as a Cu(II) compound would have a d9 configuration and be expected to be paramagnetic. 
Studies using XPS indicate that all of the copper atoms have an oxidation state of +1. This contradicts a formulation based on the crystal structure and obeying the octet rule that is found in many textbooks (e.g.) describing CuS as containing both CuI and CuII i.e. (Cu+)2Cu2+(S2)2−S2−. An alternative formulation as (Cu+)3(S2−)(S2)− was proposed and supported by calculations.
The formulation should not be interpreted as containing radical anion, but rather that there is a delocalized valence "hole".
Electron paramagnetic resonance studies on the precipitation of Cu(II) salts indicates that the reduction of Cu(II) to Cu(I) occurs in solution.

See also
Copper sulfide for an overview of all copper sulfide phases
Copper(I) sulfide, Cu2S
Covellite

References

Sulfides
Copper(II) compounds
Disulfides